Gold-Burg High School or Gold-Burg Secondary School is a 1A public high school located near unincorporated Stoneburg, Texas (USA) but has a Bowie mailing address.  It is part of the Gold-Burg Independent School District located in western Montague County and is a consolidation of Ringgold and Stoneburg. In 2011, the school was rated "Academically Acceptable" by the Texas Education Agency.

Athletics
The Gold-Burg Bears compete in the following sports:

Basketball
Cross Country
6-Man Football
Golf
Tennis
Track and Field
Volleyball

State Titles
Girls Golf - 
1985(1A)

See also

List of high schools in Texas
List of Six-man football stadiums in Texas

References

External links
Gold-Burg ISD

Schools in Montague County, Texas
Public high schools in Texas
Public middle schools in Texas